Era Ora is a one Michelin-star Italian restaurant located in the Christianshavn neighbourhood of Copenhagen, Denmark.

History
Era Ora was opened in 1983 by Italian born chef Elvio Milleri and his Brazilian-born wife Edelvita Santos. The restaurant was then located at Torvegade 62 and the owners lived on the first floor. The restaurant received its first star in the Michelin Guide in 1997. The restaurant relocated to its current premises at Christianshavn Canal in 2001.

Building
The restaurant is located at Overgaden Neden Vandet 33B.

References

External links

 Official website

Restaurants in Copenhagen
1983 establishments in Denmark